Jeffrey Wasserman (1946 – July 2, 2006, in Millerton, New York) was an abstract artist who became known in New York in the 1980s for his colorful and expressive oil paintings.

Background
He was an early pioneer in Soho and showed his work extensively in the East Village and Soho during the 1980s and 1990s. He was closely allied with artists Jeff Koons, Peter Halley and Saint Clair Cemin.

Wasserman died of cancer at his home on July 2, 2006.

References

External links
 Official website
 http://findarticles.com/p/articles/mi_m1248/is_n12_v83/ai_17860746

1946 births
2006 deaths
Jewish American artists
Deaths from cancer in New York (state)
Jewish painters
20th-century American painters
American male painters
21st-century American painters
21st-century American male artists
Painters from New York City
People from Millerton, New York
20th-century American Jews
21st-century American Jews
20th-century American male artists